Keith N. Johnson (born February 19, 1953) is an American actor best known for his performances at the Arena Stage in Washington D.C. and for his small roles in films such as Major League II and David Mamet's Homicide. On television, he was in several episodes of Homicide: Life on the Street from 1993 to 1995. Though he was born in Washington, D.C., he spent his childhood in Blythewood, South Carolina.

Johnson earned critical acclaim for his performances in the theatrical productions such as The Piano Lesson, Fences, Driving Miss Daisy, and the world premier of Zora Neale Hurston's Polk County and for his participation in musical plays with such artists as Olu Dara, Diane McIntyre, and Trazana Beverly. He played Willie Brown in the Kennedy Center musical production Blues Journey. In August Wilson's Fences he played Gabriel to Bill Cobbs' Troy.

References

External links

1953 births
African-American male actors
American male stage actors
American male film actors
American male television actors
Male actors from Washington, D.C.
Living people
People from Blythewood, South Carolina
21st-century African-American people
20th-century African-American people